Dennis Latos (born March 11, 1992) is an American film director, producer and editor. Dennis directed, produced, and edited the short film, Leylak, which held its world premiere at the 20th Annual Tribeca Film Festival in June 2021 and was awarded a Special Jury Prize for the film.

Early life 
Dennis Latos was born in Flushing, New York to Greek-American parents. His mother, Julie ( Tsouros), was a florist. His father, Panagiotis (known as Peter) Latos, was a lawyer who ran Latos & Latos law firm in Astoria, Queens.

Dennis Latos attended St. Mary's High School. During his senior year, Latos was accepted to New York University's Tisch School of the Arts Summer Program in Dublin, Ireland.

After graduating high school, Latos attended Emerson College. That November, his father Peter, aged 44, had been diagnosed with an extremely aggressive and virulent stage 4 prostate cancer. After the news, Latos decided to withdraw from Emerson and move back to New York. He transferred into Hofstra University, where he continued his film studies, and made the Provost's List each semester he was there.

Latos then started working as an assistant music video editor and production assistant on music videos for artists such as Fabolous, Red Cafe, Jadakiss, Young Jeezy and Machine Gun Kelly. Latos then created his own production company, Latos Entertainment.

On June 29, 2013, Latos's father died from prostate cancer at age 48. Shortly thereafter, Dennis and his younger brother Stavros (born 1994), formed The Peter Latos Prostate Cancer Foundation (PLPCF) in memory of their father. The foundation's mission is to save lives through early detection and to provide prostate cancer screenings and PSA blood tests for those in need. The foundation also aims to increase awareness through education and provides information about prostate cancer to the public.

Career
In late 2014, Latos landed an internship with Warner Bros. Hollywood producer Michael Tadross at Kaufman Astoria Studios. Tadross is responsible for producing such iconic films such as Coming to America, Die Hard with a Vengeance, Rollerball, The Thomas Crown Affair, I am Legend, Hitch, Sherlock Holmes, Gangster Squad, Winter's Tale, and Ocean's 8. Latos worked in the production office and on set as a production assistant for Tadross's film, Run All Night starring Liam Neeson and Ed Harris.

Short films 
On June 24, 2016, Bardo premiered at The Dolby Theatre in New York City.

Latos and Aharoni then met with Los Angeles based and student Emmy nominated screenwriter Arthur Panoyan to direct their next short film, The Untimely Gift. On October 13, 2017, the film was screened at the Directors Guild of America Theatre in New York City with an audience of over 500 people.

In August 2020, Latos and Aharoni filmed their next short film, Leylak, during the midst of the COVID-19 pandemic, which also plays a role in the film. It held its world premiere at the Tribeca Film Festival on June 12, 2021.

Filmography

As director

Film

Accolades

Film festival awards

References

External links

1992 births
American adoptees
American male film actors
Film producers from New York (state)
American music video directors
Action film directors
Living people
People from New York (state)
Television commercial directors
Film directors from New York City
American people of Greek descent
Greek film directors